The Bloodline is a villainous professional wrestling stable currently performing in WWE. The stable is led by Roman Reigns and features his real-life cousins The Usos (Jey Uso and Jimmy Uso) and Solo Sikoa, members of the renowned Anoa'i family. The group also includes Paul Heyman, who serves as their manager, and had also included Sami Zayn as an honorary member from mid-2022 to early 2023.

Reigns is promoted as the Undisputed WWE Universal Champion, as he simultaneously holds both the WWE and Universal championships in his fourth and second respective reigns, having the longest reign of the latter. He also took on the nicknames "Tribal Chief" and "Head of the Table" in reference to his role as the leader of the family. His cousins, The Usos, are promoted as the Undisputed WWE Tag Team Champions, simultaneously holding both the Raw and SmackDown tag team championships in their third and fifth respective reigns, having the longest reign and the longest male tag team title reign in WWE history for the latter.

Background

The Bloodline members have long histories before the advent of the stable. Roman Reigns, the son of Sika Anoa'i, made his professional wrestling debut in 2010 at WWE's former developmental territory, Florida Championship Wrestling (FCW), under the ring name Leakee. After FCW was shutdown and rebranded as NXT in 2012, he took on the name "Roman Reigns" and had a short stint on NXT before being called up to the main roster in late 2012 where he became part of The Shield with Seth Rollins and Dean Ambrose; he would later win multiple world championships after the stable's dissolution in 2014. Meanwhile, The Usos (Jey Uso and Jimmy Uso) and Solo Sikoa are the sons of Rikishi. The Usos made their pro wrestling debut in 2009 where they were one time FCW Tag Team Champions before moving to the main roster in 2010 where they were managed by Tamina Snuka and would go on to win multiple tag team championships. Sikoa made his pro wrestling debut in 2018 before signing with the WWE in 2021 where he made his NXT debut that October until his main roster call up in September 2022.

Paul Heyman's managership and relationship with the Anoa'i family dates back to 1988 when he, under his Paul E. Dangerously name, managed The Samoan SWAT Team which composed of Rikishi (then known as Fatu), Rosey (then known as Big Matty Smalls), Samu and Sam Fatu (also known as The Samoan Savage). Many years later, Heyman, also introduced Reigns, alongside with Rollins and Ambrose, as The Shield, who were hired as mercenaries for then-WWE Champion CM Punk in 2012.

The Usos' relationship with Sami Zayn began when they had their first match together facing against The Ascension (Konnor and Viktor) and Corey Graves on the April 24, 2014, episode of WWE NXT in a six-man tag team match with the trio emerging victorious.

History

The Usos feud with The Shield (2013–2014)
Before The Usos began teaming up with Reigns, they had several matches against The Shield, Reigns' stable with Seth Rollins and Dean Ambrose, with the majority taking place in 2013. On the May 6 episode of Raw, The Usos and Kofi Kingston teamed up against The Shield, who won the match after Ambrose pinned Kingston. On the May 17 episode of SmackDown, Reigns and Rollins defeated The Usos after Reigns pinned Jey. After the match, The Shield continued to beat down Jey until Kingston ran to make the save by hitting them with a steel chair. The Usos gained their first win on the June 28 episode of SmackDown after their teammate, Christian, pinned Ambrose in another six-man tag team match. On the July 1 episode of Raw, however, they lost a rematch, this time with Ambrose pinning Christian. On the July 12 episode of SmackDown, Rollins defeated Jey in a singles match. At Money in the Bank on July 14, Reigns and Rollins defeated The Usos to retain the WWE Tag Team Championship after Reigns pinned Jimmy. On the July 19 episode on SmackDown, the two stables brawled until Mark Henry came to The Usos' aid. In return, The Usos helped Henry fend off The Shield on the July 22 episode of Raw. The following week, they lost after Ambrose pinned Jimmy. Despite this, Henry attacked The Shield after the match, forcing them to retreat. The same match result occurred on the August 7 episode of Main Event. Throughout the remainder of the year, the two stables would exchange wins, with The Usos teaming with the likes of Kofi Kingston, Dolph Ziggler, Daniel Bryan, Big E Langston, Cody Rhodes and Goldust, Rey Mysterio and CM Punk. The last match that the two stables would have against each other is on the January 3, 2014, episode of SmackDown, where The Usos and Punk won after the latter pinned Ambrose.

Occasional team-ups (2015–2020)
Following his split from The Shield and his subsequent singles career, Reigns would occasionally join forces with The Usos in numerous tag-team matches, with The Usos also occasionally becoming involved in Reigns' feuds in support of their cousin. The trio first teamed together on the November 2, 2015, episode of Raw, where they teamed with Ryback and Dean Ambrose in a 5-on-5 Survivor Series elimination match against Seth Rollins, Kevin Owens, and The New Day (Kofi Kingston, Big E, and Xavier Woods), in which Reigns' team was victorious. Reigns and the Usos continued to team that year until Tribute to the Troops, where the trio teamed with Ambrose, Ryback, Kane, and The Dudley Boyz to defeat defeated The League of Nations and The Wyatt Family.

On the May 2, 2016, episode of Raw, The Usos became involved in Reigns' feud with AJ Styles, as the duo had been feuding with Styles' allies, Luke Gallows and Karl Anderson at the time, with The Usos and Reigns facing Styles, Gallows and Anderson in a six-man tag team match. After Styles, Anderson and Gallows won the match, Anderson and Gallows wanted Styles to hit Reigns with a chair but Styles refused. When The Usos attacked Styles from behind with a chair, Styles retaliated with the chair. Ultimately, Reigns powerbombed Styles through the broadcast table. At Extreme Rules, The Usos were defeated by Gallows and Anderson in a Tornado tag team match. Later that same night, after Gallows and Anderson interfered in the WWE World Heavyweight Championship match between Reigns and Styles, The Usos interfered to assist Reigns, ultimately allowing Reigns to retain the title.

On the May 14, 2019, episode of SmackDown, The Usos aided Reigns from an attack by Elias, Shane McMahon, Daniel Bryan, and Rowan, and then lost to them in a handicap match. On the June 3 episode of Raw, The Usos saved Reigns from an attack by Drew McIntyre and The Revival (Dash Wilder and Scott Dawson), but lost to them in a six-man tag team match. On the January 3, 2020, episode of SmackDown, The Usos returned with a new short hair look, aiding Reigns from an attack by King Corbin and Dolph Ziggler. On the January 31 episode of SmackDown, Reigns and The Usos defeated King Corbin, Dolph Ziggler, and Robert Roode in a six-man tag team match to end their feud. Jimmy suffered a legitimate knee injury during the match at WrestleMania 36, putting him out of in-ring action indefinitely.

Formation of The Bloodline (2020–2021)
At SummerSlam on August 23, 2020, Reigns returned after a five-month hiatus and attacked both newly crowned Universal Champion "The Fiend" Bray Wyatt and Braun Strowman, turning heel for the first time since 2014. On the August 28 episode of SmackDown, it was revealed Reigns allied himself with Paul Heyman. At Payback two days later, Reigns defeated Wyatt and Strowman in a No Holds Barred triple threat match to win his second Universal Championship. On the September 4 episode of SmackDown, after Big E was attacked and injured in storyline, Jey took Big E's place in a fatal-four-way match against Matt Riddle, King Corbin, and Sheamus, where the winner would earn a Universal Championship match at Clash of Champions. Jey won by pinning Riddle to earn the first singles championship opportunity of his career. At the event, Jey lost to Reigns by technical knockout, when Jimmy came down and threw a white towel for him. Jey was given another title shot against Reigns in a Hell in a Cell "I Quit" match at the namesake event with the added stipulation that if Jey lost, he would have to follow Reigns' orders or be kicked out of their family. At the event, Jey lost again after Reigns attacked the injured Jimmy and forced Jey to say "I quit" to save his brother.

On the October 30 episode of SmackDown, Jey defeated Daniel Bryan to qualify for Team SmackDown at Survivor Series. After the match, Jey attacked Bryan at the request of Reigns, thus turning heel and aligning with Reigns in the process, and subsequently became known as Reigns' "right-hand man" and also received the moniker "Main Event Jey Uso". On February 21, 2021, at Elimination Chamber, Jey competed in the event's eponymous match, where the winner would receive a Universal Championship with Reigns that same night. He was the last person eliminated by the winner Daniel Bryan. On the April 9 special WrestleMania episode of SmackDown, Jey won the Andre the Giant Memorial Battle Royal  by last eliminating Shinsuke Nakamura. This marked Jey's first major singles accolade in WWE.

Jimmy returned from injury on the May 7 episode of SmackDown, but did not approve of the alliance between Jey and Reigns, as he called Jey "Reigns' bitch" and started wearing a t-shirt that said "Nobody's Bitch". On the June 4 episode of SmackDown, The Usos reunited and challenged The Mysterios (Rey Mysterio and Dominik Mysterio) for the SmackDown Tag Team Championship, however, the match ended in a controversial finish in which the referee did not notice that Jimmy had his shoulder up during the pin. The Usos were granted a rematch later that same night, but during the rematch, Reigns interfered by attacking the Mysterios, not wanting The Usos to embarrass themselves again. Following the match, Reigns brutally attacked Rey's son Dominik, which Jimmy felt Reigns took too far, also furthering tensions between Reigns and Jimmy. The ensuing dissension between the two over Jey's allegiance eventually caused Jey to temporarily walk out on the June 11 episode of SmackDown, after which, Reigns manipulated Jimmy into feeling guilty for their recent dissension. As a result, the following week on the June 18 episode of SmackDown, Jimmy offered his help to Reigns during his Hell in a Cell match with Rey Mysterio, and he rose Reigns' hand after the match. The following week on SmackDown, Jimmy attempted to assist Reigns when Edge attacked him and speared him through the barricade.

On the July 9 episode of SmackDown, Jey returned and both Usos solidified their alliance with Reigns, thus cementing them both as heels in the process, and properly reuniting as "The Bloodline."

All champions (2021–2022)
On the July 16 episode of SmackDown, the first episode after the WWE resumed touring due to the COVID-19 pandemic, The Bloodline faced Edge and The Mysterios in a six-man tag team match, in which they emerged victorious, although Edge attacked the trio after the match. At Money in the Bank, The Usos defeated The Mysterios on the Kickoff pre-show to become five time SmackDown Tag Team Champions. In the main event, Reigns defeated Edge to retain the Universal Championship. At SummerSlam, The Usos once again defeated The Mysterios to retain the SmackDown Tag Team Championships, and Reigns later defeated John Cena in the main event to retain the Universal Championship. At Extreme Rules, The Usos successfully defended their titles against The Street Profits, and Reigns later defeated "The Demon" Finn Bálor in the main event to retain the Universal Championship. At Crown Jewel, The Usos defeated The Hurt Business (Cedric Alexander and Shelton Benjamin) on the Kickoff pre-show, while Reigns successfully defended his title against Brock Lesnar in the main event. At Survivor Series, The Usos lost to Raw Tag Team Champions RK-Bro (Randy Orton and Riddle), while Reigns defeated WWE Champion Big E in the main event. On December 17 episode of SmackDown, Reigns fired and attacked Heyman. Brock Lesnar then attacked The Bloodline and saved Heyman. On January 1, 2022, Reigns was pulled from the WWE Day 1 pay-per-view match due to testing positive for COVID-19, while Brock Lesnar was instead added to Raw's WWE Championship match. The Usos still competed at Day 1, and successfully retained their titles against The New Day (Kofi Kingston and Xavier Woods).
 
At WrestleMania 38, The Usos successfully defended their SmackDown Tag Team Championships against Shinsuke Nakamura and Rick Boogs, while Reigns was able to capture the WWE Championship from Brock Lesnar, effectively unifying the WWE Championship with the Universal Championship, becoming the Undisputed WWE Universal Champion. The Usos also defeated RK-Bro at the May 20 episode of SmackDown, becoming the Undisputed WWE Tag Team Champions and thus making all members of the faction double champions.

The "Honorary Uce"
Around this time, Sami Zayn, who had also been in a rivalry with McIntyre, started associating himself with the Bloodline, and later became an honorary member of the group. At first, Zayn found it tricky to ingratiate himself into the group, which until this point had consisted only of members of the same family with the exception of Heyman; however, owing to his puppyish enthusiasm and apparent devotion to The Tribal Chief, Zayn gradually began to become accepted by the group, especially Jimmy, with whom Zayn had formed a bond. Zayn began to style himself as "The Honorary Uce". 
On the September 23, 2022, episode of SmackDown, Zayn was ordered by Reigns to remove his Bloodline t-shirt. Initially saddened, Zayn was then presented with a t-shirt that read "Honorary Uce," making his position as member of the Bloodline official.

Expansion and tensions (2022–present)
At SummerSlam on July 30, The Usos defeated The Street Profits to retain the Undisputed WWE Tag Team Championship, while Reigns successfully defended the Undisputed WWE Universal Championship against Brock Lesnar in a Last Man Standing match.

At Clash at the Castle on September 3, Reigns defeated Drew McIntyre to retain the Undisputed WWE Universal Championship following interference from Solo Sikoa, Reigns' younger cousin and Usos' younger brother, who became the newest member of The Bloodline. On the September 13 episode of NXT, Sikoa defeated Carmelo Hayes to win the NXT North American Championship, giving The Bloodline a total of five championships and making them the first stable to hold titles across all three brands. However, in the following week, Sikoa had to vacate the NXT North American Championship due to not being an eligible option in the fan vote that was to have originally determined Hayes' opponent. At Crown Jewel on November 5, The Usos successfully retained their titles against The Brawling Brutes while Reigns successfully retained his titles against Logan Paul. Three weeks later at Survivor Series: WarGames on November 26, The Bloodline defeated The Brawling Brutes, Drew McIntyre and Kevin Owens in a WarGames match, with Sami solidifying his place in the group in the eyes of Jey.

After losing to Owens and the returning John Cena on the final SmackDown of 2022, The Bloodline began a feud with Owens who would later challenge Reigns for the Undisputed WWE Universal Championship at the Royal Rumble. Meanwhile, The Usos, Sikoa and Zayn had been wreaking havoc on Raw over several weeks, which led to Adam Pearce ordering The Usos to defend the Raw Tag Team Championship against The Judgment Day, who had won the championship opportunity in a tag team turmoil match on the January 9, 2023 episode of Raw.

At Raw Is XXX on January 23, 2023, Sami Zayn was put on trial by Reigns in "Tribal Court," in which Reigns accused Zayn of plotting against the Bloodline and being secretly in league with his longtime "frenemy" Kevin Owens.  Paul Heyman acted as prosecutor, showing several videos of perceived treachery towards the Bloodline. Just as Zayn was about to be declared guilty by Reigns, Jey Uso offered a passionate defense of The Honorary Uce, leading to Zayn being declared innocent by Reigns, albeit grudgingly.

Later that night, The Usos defended their Raw Tag Team Championships against The Judgment Day (represented by Damian Priest and Dominik Mysterio), but after Jimmy suffered a mid-match injury, Zayn took his place alongside Jey and the two were victorious.

At the Royal Rumble event, Reigns retained the Undisputed WWE Universal Championship against Kevin Owens. Following the match, it was a in-ring segment where the Bloodline attacked Owens, handcuffing him to the ropes and beating him. Reigns asked Zayn to hit him, but Zayn hit Reigns with the chair, turning face in the process. The group then beat down Zayn. Also, Jey walked away midway through. Jimmy appeared at Elimination Chamber and tried to assist Reigns in his title defence against Zayn, while Jey entered the ring and prevented Reigns from attacking Zayn with a steel chair, after the referee had been knocked unconscious. Reigns ended up retaining his title.

On the March 6 episode of Raw, Jey showed up in the crowd during Jimmy's match against Zayn which Jimmy lost. Following the match, Jey appeared to hug Zayn before superkicking him, signaling Jey's allegiance to The Bloodline. The Usos and Sikoa assaulted Zayn before Cody Rhodes ran out to save Zayn.

Members

Current

Former

Sub-groups

Current

Timeline

Championships and accomplishments
 CBS Sports
 Feud of the Year (2020) – 
 ESPN
 Best storyline of the year (2022) – 
 Pro Wrestling Illustrated
 Faction of the Year (2022)
Singles wrestlers
 Ranked Reigns No. 1 of the top 500 singles wrestlers in the PWI 500 in 2022
 Ranked Jey Uso No. 45 of the top 500 singles wrestlers in the PWI 500 in 2021
 Ranked Jimmy Uso No. 147 of the top 500 singles wrestlers in the PWI 500 in 2022
 Ranked Sikoa No. 401 of the top 500 singles wrestlers in the PWI 500 in 2022
Tag teams
 Ranked The Usos No. 1 of the top 50 Tag Teams in the PWI Tag Team 100 in 2022
 Sports Illustrated
 Wrestler of the Year (2021) – 
 WWE
 WWE Championship (1 time, current) – Reigns
 WWE Universal Championship (1 time, current) – Reigns
 WWE Raw Tag Team Championship (1 time, current) – The Usos
 WWE SmackDown Tag Team Championship (1 time, current) – The Usos
 NXT North American Championship (1 time) – Sikoa
 André the Giant Memorial Battle Royal (2021) – Jey Uso

Notes

References

External links
 
 
 
 
 
 

Anoa'i family
WWE teams and stables